Rachel Chatterjee is a retired Indian Administrative Service (IAS) Officer and the first women to be appointed as the Chairperson of Andhra Pradesh Public Service Commission.

Biography
She was born to K.J Chandy in Chennai, Tamil Nadu and was raised in a Syrian Christian family. She has two sisters and one brother. She did her M. A. in English and a diploma in Journalism. She joined the Indian Administrative Services in 1975 and was allotted to the Andhra Pradesh Cadre.

She is married to Tishya Chatterjee, her batch mate and also a bureaucrat, in 1976. They have two children. She has worked for more than thirty as a bureaucrat at different places and has been a district collector in three different districts.

Positions held
 District Collector of Anantapur District(1983-1984).
 Commissioner of Municipal Corporation Of Hyderabad (1992-1993).
 Chairman & Managing Director for AP Transco.
 Principal Secretary to Department of Medial & Health.
 Principal Secretary to Department of Social Welfare.
 Director, Ministry of Textiles, Govt. of India (1984-1985).

Achievements
The Government of Canada awarded her the Lester Pearson Fellowship at the University of Ottawa.

References

External links
 Profile on Govt. Website

1950 births
Living people
Indian civil servants